Canard is a French restaurant with two locations in the U.S. state of Oregon. The original restaurant opened in Portland. A second location opened in Oregon City in 2022.

Description
Canard (French for "duck") is a restaurant with two locations in the U.S. state of Oregon. The original restaurant is located on East Burnside Street in southeast Portland's Buckman neighborhood, next to Le Pigeon, and a second location operates in nearby Oregon City.

The menu includes small plates such as foie gras dumplings with peanut sauce, fried chicken wings with truffle ranch, and sea urchin on Texas toast. The tartare is served with Chinese sausage, beef, and broccoli, and the New York steak comes with French onion soup sauce and Swiss cheese toast. The brunch menu includes fried chicken sandwiches with orange chile-wasabi mayonnaise, French toast, oysters, pancakes with duck sausage gravy, and Shrimp Toast Benedict. Canard also has a cocktail menu.

History
Co-owners Gabriel Rucker and Andy Fortgang (Le Pigeon, Little Bird Bistro) opened the restaurant in April 2018. The restaurant's interior was designed by Mark Annen. The restaurant launched brunch in May.

In 2022, owners announced plans to open a second location in Oregon City. The restaurant is slated to open on July 10.

Reception
In 2018, Eater named Canard one of the "18 Best New Restaurants in America". Eater Portland, Portland Monthly, and The Oregonian named Canard the restaurant of the year. The restaurant was a semifinalist in the Outstanding Wine Program of the 2020 James Beard Awards. Alex Frane and Brooke Jackson-Glidden included Canard in Eater Portland 2021 list of "11 Charming French Restaurants in Portland".

See also

 List of French restaurants

References

External links

 
 Canard at Condé Nast Traveler

2018 establishments in Oregon
Buckman, Portland, Oregon
French restaurants in Portland, Oregon
Restaurants established in 2018
Restaurants in Oregon City, Oregon